The spherical model is a model of ferromagnetism similar to the Ising model, which was solved in 1952 by T. H. Berlin and M. Kac. It has the remarkable property that for linear dimension d greater than four, the critical exponents that govern the behaviour of the system near the critical point are independent of d and the geometry of the system. It is one of the few models of ferromagnetism that can be solved exactly in the presence of an external field.

Formulation 
The model describes a set of particles on a lattice  containing N sites.

which in a homogeneous system ensures that the average of the square of any spin is one, as in the usual Ising model.

The partition function generalizes from that of the Ising model to

Berlin and Kac saw this as an approximation to the usual Ising model, arguing that the -summation in the Ising model can be viewed as a sum over all corners of an N-dimensional hypercube in -space. The becomes an integration over the surface of a hypersphere passing through all such corners.

It was rigorously proved by Kac and C. J. Thompson that the spherical model is a limiting case of the N-vector model.

Equation of state 
Solving the partition function and using a calculation of the free energy yields an equation describing the magnetization M of the system

for the function g defined as

The internal energy per site is given by

an exact relation relating internal energy and magnetization.

Critical behaviour
For  the critical temperature occurs at absolute zero, resulting in no phase transition for the spherical model. For d greater than 2, the spherical model exhibits the typical ferromagnetic behaviour, with a finite Curie temperature where ferromagnetism ceases. The critical behaviour of the spherical model was derived in the completely general circumstances that the dimension d may be a real non-integer dimension.

which are independent of the dimension of d when it is greater than four, the dimension being able to take any real value.

References 

 R. J. Baxter, Exactly solved models in statistical mechanics, London, Academic Press, 1982; 2007 Dover reprint, with a new chapter "Subsequent Developments"

Further reading 

Lattice models
Exactly solvable models